The Dortan massacre was a massacre in which approximately 35 French civilians were killed by Wehrmacht volunteers in the village of Dortan, Ain during World War II. It was perpetrated by Volunteer Cossack-Stamm-Regiment 5, part of the Freiwilligen-Stamm-Division, in 12–21 July 1944 during Operation Treffenfeld. It was part of a wider German anti-partisan offensive against the French Maquis de l'Ain et du Haut-Jura, which staged a massive uprising in mid-1944 along with other French resistance groups.

Background
Resistance activity in German-occupied France increased significantly in 1944 after the Allied landings in Normandy. Various Maquis units staged uprisings throughout France, capturing villages and fighting the German occupiers. German units feared the imminent Allied landing in Southern France and ramped up anti-partisan operations to recapture and control the French countryside. One of the planned offensives was Operation Treffenfeld, a large-scale offensive aimed at destroying the French resistance of the Maquis de l'Ain et du Haut-Jura. This group had been active in the Ain department for years and had its stronghold around the city of Oyonnax. They conducted widespread sabotage actions against the German infrastructure in the region, and German efforts had been mostly unsuccessful at nullifying the threat.

Massacre
The German offensive against the French Maquis was mostly successful and they advanced through the Jura Mountains with great speed. The Germans proceeded with utmost brutality; French civilians were frequently accused of being partisan sympathizers and executed on the spot. The village of Dortan is just a few kilometers from Oyonnax.

On 12 July the Volunteer Cossack-Stamm-Regiment 5 of the Freiwilligen-Stamm-Division, an Ostlegion unit of volunteers from occupied USSR territory fighting for the Wehrmacht, approached the village. After arrival, the village was declared a "bandit center" (Banditenzentrum) and widespread looting commenced. Seven people, including the local priest, were shot immediately. The next day, killings continued in what the Germans described as "reprisal actions". The local women were systematically raped, and two of them murdered afterwards. 24 civilians were killed the first two days.

The Wehrmacht established a local headquarters in the town to coordinate their operations in the nearby countryside. On 20 July, sixteen men from the nearby Château de Dortan were arrested and tortured. The next day, the Germans proceeded to burn the entire village down to the ground. More people were executed, bringing the final death toll to about 35.  The Germans left the town in ruins.

Aftermath
The village was rebuilt after the war and a street was named as a memorial of the events of the 21 July. A monument has been erected to honour the victims of the killings. Several plaques and other memorials remind of the massacre.

Notes

References

Bibliography
 
 
 
 

1944 murders in France
1944 in France
Massacres in 1944
Collective punishment
French Resistance
July 1944 events
Mass murder in 1944
Massacres in France
Nazi war crimes in France
Vichy France
Mass shootings in France